Martha Lipton (April 6, 1913 – November 28, 2006) was an American operatic mezzo-soprano.

Biography
Lipton was born in New York City. She won a scholarship to the Juilliard School and made her debut as Pauline in Tchaikovsky's opera The Queen of Spades for the New Opera Company in Manhattan in 1941. After making her first appearance with the New York City Opera in 1944 (their first season, and returned in 1958 and 1961), she went on to appear 401 times at the Metropolitan Opera. Her most frequent assignments at the Met were as Annina in Der Rosenkavalier and Emilia in Otello. She also performed as Mrs. Sedley in Peter Grimes in 1948, Mother Goose in The Rake's Progress, in 1953, and Madame Larina in the 1957 Peter Brook staging of Eugene Onegin. Her final appearance at the Met was as the Innkeeper in Boris Godunov in 1961.

Lipton also sang in Europe. She sang the title role in Benjamin Britten's The Rape of Lucretia for the English Opera Group in 1954, and in 1956 starred as Augusta in the world premiere of Douglas Moore's seminal opera The Ballad of Baby Doe at the Central City Opera House in Colorado.

Lipton was active during the 1950s as a recording artist for Columbia Records. Her recordings with Columbia included Mahler's Third Symphony, featuring Leonard Bernstein leading the New York Philharmonic and Bruckner's Te Deum led by Bruno Walter. With Aaron Copland on piano, she recorded Copland's Twelve Poems of Emily Dickinson. One of her best known recordings was  Handel's Messiah with Eugene Ormandy and the Philadelphia Orchestra and the Mormon Tabernacle Choir. She also participated in Ormandy's complete recording of Die Fledermaus singing the role of Prince Orlofsky.

Lipton became a professor of voice at Indiana University in 1960. While serving as a professor, she also performed in many Indiana University opera productions. Most notably, Lipton played the role of Amneris from Giuseppe Verdi's opera Aida in IU's outdoor stage production at Memorial Stadium in July and August 1963. In 1983, Lipton officially retired from teaching with the rank of professor emeritus. She continued to teach part-time until her death.

Lipton died in Bloomington, Indiana, on November 28, 2006. She was 93.

References

1913 births
2006 deaths
American operatic mezzo-sopranos
Singers from New York City
Musicians from Bloomington, Indiana
Jacobs School of Music faculty
Juilliard School alumni
20th-century American women opera singers
Classical musicians from New York (state)
Women music educators
Singers from Indiana
Classical musicians from Indiana
21st-century American women